Martin Pulpit (born 29 January 1967) is a Czech football manager and former player.

He was announced as the new manager of Viktoria Žižkov in June 2010, replacing Vlastimil Petržela. Pulpit guided Žižkov to the Czech First League via a second-place finish in the 2010–11 Czech 2. Liga, but fourteen games into the 2011–12 Czech First League, he was sacked with the club having scored just seven points at that stage. He took over at Příbram in May 2016, replacing outgoing manager Pavel Tobiáš.

References

External links
 Profile at idnes.cz 

1967 births
Living people
Czech footballers
Czech football managers
Czech First League managers
FK Mladá Boleslav managers
FC Hradec Králové managers
FC Viktoria Plzeň managers
FK Baník Sokolov managers
SK Sigma Olomouc managers
FK Baník Most managers
FK Viktoria Žižkov managers
FC Baník Ostrava managers
1. FK Příbram managers
Association football defenders
Footballers from Prague
MFK Vítkovice managers
FK Frýdek-Místek managers
Czech National Football League managers
Bohemian Football League managers